Apollo Diamond Inc. was a company based in Boston, Massachusetts that was able to produce nearly flawless single crystal diamond wafers and crystals for potential use in the optoelectronics, nanotechnology, and consumer gem markets. The company used chemical vapor deposition (CVD) for the production of their gem-sized synthetic diamond crystals, and obtained several U.S. patents on the process. The company's techniques were able to produce colorless gems, in contrast to previous diamond-making techniques which usually produced colored diamonds.

In 2011, many assets of Apollo Diamond were acquired by Scio Diamond Technology Corporation, which said it would use the technology at its South Carolina facility.

See also
 List of synthetic diamond manufacturers

Notes

External linksreat
SCIO Diamond website
The New Diamond Age, Wired, September 11, 2003
Diamonds on Demand, Smithsonian, June, 2008
US Patents awarded to Apollo Diamond
USAToday: Nanotechnology's everywhere, May 2005

Synthetic diamond